The 1934–35 NHL season was the 18th season of the National Hockey League (NHL). Nine teams each played 48 games. The Montreal Maroons were the Stanley Cup winners as they swept the Toronto Maple Leafs in three games in the Stanley Cup Finals.

League business

In the midst of the Great Depression financial difficulties continued for the Ottawa Senators. The franchise transferred to St. Louis, changing the nickname to the Eagles. The Ottawa organization continued the Senators as a senior amateur team. Despite the new locale the franchise was not profitable in St. Louis either, due in part high travel expenses resulting from still being in the Canadian Division. The Eagles would sell players Syd Howe and Ralph "Scotty" Bowman to Detroit for $50,000 to make ends meet.

Montreal Canadiens owners Leo Dandurand and Joseph Cattarinich sell the team to Ernest Savard and Maurice Forget of the Canadian Arena Company.

The penalty shot, an invention of the old Pacific Coast Hockey Association (PCHA), was introduced in the NHL this season. The puck was placed in a 10-foot circle,  from the goalmouth. The player could shoot while stationary within the circle, or could shoot while moving, as long as the shot was taken within the circle.

Several more teams changed from a single uniform to a light version and dark version. The Detroit Red Wings introduced a white version of their existing uniform, swapping red elements for white elements. The Chicago Black Hawks introduced a new uniform design, and differentiated between versions by using white in the main horizontal stripe and their socks, and using brown in the other version. The New York Americans and Toronto Maple Leafs continued using their two sets of uniforms. The Boston Bruins, Montreal Canadiens, Montreal Maroons, New York Rangers and St. Louis Eagles used only a single uniform design each.

Regular season

Charlie Conacher decided to play coy this year and Conn Smythe had trouble signing him. With Harvey Jackson out, it looked as though Joe Primeau would be the only member of the Kid line in action for Toronto. However, he did finally sign. Conacher responded with his best season, scoring 36 goals and leading the league in scoring.

A bombshell trade was made with Howie Morenz, Lorne Chabot and Marty Burke going to Chicago for Leroy Goldsworthy, Roger Jenkins, and Lionel Conacher. Although Morenz was not his old self, he did help Chicago, who finished second in the American Division, just falling short of Boston by only one point. The Canadiens then traded Lionel Conacher and Herb Cain to the Maroons for Nels Crutchfield. The trades did not help and the Canadiens lost some fans.

Meanwhile, Tommy Gorman bought a share of the Montreal Maroons from James Strachan and when he picked up Alex Connell, he had another winner.

The first penalty shot was awarded to the Montreal Canadiens' Armand Mondou on November 10, 1934; he was stopped by the Toronto Maple Leafs' George Hainsworth. On November 13, Ralph "Scotty" Bowman of the St. Louis Eagles scored the first penalty shot goal in NHL history.

The playoffs continued to elude the New York Americans, but they added two important additions, left wing Dave "Sweeney" Schriner and right wing Lorne Carr. Teamed with centre Art Chapman, the Americans were on the way up.

Final standings

Playoffs

Playoff bracket

Quarterfinals

(A2) Chicago Black Hawks vs. (C2) Montreal Maroons
Chicago coach Clem Loughlin said that the team who won the series very likely would win the Stanley Cup. Neither team scored after two regulation games. In the overtime, Maroons forward Dave Trottier was cut and retired for stitches. He had hardly arrived in the dressing room when Baldy Northcott scored the goal that won the series for the Maroons.

(A3) New York Rangers vs. (C3) Montreal Canadiens

Semifinals
Toronto's goaltender George Hainsworth got hot and eliminated the Bruins, while the Rangers outlasted the Montreal Canadiens on Bill Cook's goal in the deciding game. He had been knocked goofy by the Canadiens Nels Crutchfield, but was not too groggy to win the series for the Rangers.

(C1) Toronto Maple Leafs vs. (A1) Boston Bruins

(C2) Montreal Maroons vs. (A3) New York Rangers

Stanley Cup Finals

The Montreal Maroons throttled the Kid line of Joe Primeau, Harvey Jackson and Charlie Conacher and goaltender Alex Connell time and again foiled sure goals for Toronto, and the Maroons won the series three games to none, and as game three ended, the crowd let out a roar of approval and Connell leaned back on the crossbar and cried. All of the Maroons' games ended in ties or victories, making them the last team until the 1951–52 Detroit Red Wings to not lose a single game during the playoffs. The Maroons were also the last non-Original Six team to win the Stanley Cup until the Philadelphia Flyers won it in 1974 and the last team that is currently defunct to have won a Stanley Cup.

Awards
Eddie Shore won the Hart Trophy for the second time in his career. Frank Boucher won the Lady Byng for the seventh and final time in his career, and his third consecutive time. Lorne Chabot won the Vezina for the first and only time in his career.

All-Star teams

Player statistics

Scoring leaders
Note: GP = Games played, G = Goals, A = Assists, PTS = Points, PIM = Penalties in minutes

Source: NHL.

Leading goaltenders
Note: GP = Games played; Mins = Minutes played; GA = Goals against; SO = Shutouts; GAA = Goals against average

Source: NHL.

Coaches

American Division
Boston Bruins: Frank Patrick
Chicago Black Hawks: Clem Loughlin
Detroit Red Wings: Jack Adams
New York Rangers: Lester Patrick
St. Louis Eagles: Eddie Gerard, Georges Boucher

Canadian Division
Montreal Canadiens: Leo Dandurand
Montreal Maroons: Tommy Gorman
New York Americans: Bullet Joe Simpson
Toronto Maple Leafs: Dick Irvin

Debuts
The following is a list of players of note who played their first NHL game in 1934–35 (listed with their first team, asterisk(*) marks debut in playoffs):
Tommy Anderson, Detroit Red Wings
Bucko McDonald, Detroit Red Wings
Sweeney Schriner, New York Americans
Lynn Patrick, New York Rangers
Toe Blake, Montreal Maroons
Bill Cowley, St. Louis Eagles
Art Jackson, Toronto Maple Leafs
Bob Davidson, Toronto Maple Leafs
Nick Metz, Toronto Maple Leafs

Last games
The following is a list of players of note that played their last game in the NHL in 1934–35 (listed with their last team):
John Ross Roach, Detroit Red Wings
Albert Leduc, Montreal Canadiens
Norman Gainor, Montreal Maroons
Alex Smith, New York Americans
Charley McVeigh, New York Americans
Normie Himes, New York Americans

See also
1934-35 NHL transactions
List of Stanley Cup champions
1934 in sports
1935 in sports

References
 
 
 
 
 

Notes

External links
Hockey Database

 
1934–35 in Canadian ice hockey by league
1934–35 in American ice hockey by league